Presidential pets may refer to:
United States presidential pets
List of Taiwanese presidential pets
Russian presidential pets
Pets of Vladimir Putin
Dorofei (2004–2014), cat owned by former president Dmitry Medvedev

Animals in politics